Caroline of Stolberg-Gedern may refer to the following German noblewomen:

 Caroline of Stolberg-Gedern (1732–1796)
 Caroline of Stolberg-Gedern (1755–1828)